Ollacheryphe is a genus of parasitic flies in the family Tachinidae. There are at least two described species in Ollacheryphe.

Species
These two species belong to the genus Ollacheryphe:
 Ollacheryphe aenea (Aldrich, 1934)
 Ollacheryphe facialis Townsend, 1927

References

Further reading

 
 
 
 

Tachinidae
Monotypic Brachycera genera
Articles created by Qbugbot